Dragonara Palace, also known as Palazzo Dragonara or Villa Dragonara, is a palace in St. Julian's, Malta. It was built in 1870 as a summer residence for the Scicluna family, and it is now a casino called Dragonara Casino.

Etymology
The palace is named after Dragonara Point, the peninsula on which it was built. According to local legends, a dragon lived in caves near the peninsula, but the roaring which was heard was probably the sound of the waves hitting the rocks or the howling of the wind. It is believed that the rumours of the dragon were spread by smugglers to discourage people from going to the area.
A more valid theory is that its name has been given because of the camp of Turgut Reis (known as Dragut) was in this area before the Great Siege battle on 1565, Dragut few years before conquested Gozo and moved a contingency in the area. Dragut died about 3 km away from this point, in nautical charts it is still known as Dragut Point but today is commonly known as Tignè Point because of the freemason who occupied the area just after the siege.

History

The Dragonara Palace was built in 1870 on Dragonara Point, which had been previously occupied by Ta' Għemmuna Battery. The peninsula where it is built was originally known as Għemmuna Point.

The palace served as the summer residence of Emmanuele Scicluna, a banker who became a marquis in 1875.

During World War I, it was temporarily used as an officers' hospital. Later on, the Scicluna family hosted over 100 refugees in the palace during World War II.

The palace opened as a casino on 15 July 1964, at a time when nearby Paceville began its transition from a mainly agricultural area to a tourist hub. The Dragonara Casino was the first casino in Malta, and this was a major step in establishing Malta as a tourist destination. In the 1990s, The Westin Dragonara hotel was built on part of the palace's gardens.

The casino was privatized in 1999, and the company Dragonara Casino Ltd was set up to run the business for 10 years. The palace was restored in 2008. Two years later, the casino was taken over by Dragonara Gaming Ltd, who have spent over €15 million in renovating the building. It receives about 350,000 patrons annually, making it the most popular casino in Malta.

The palace is listed on the National Inventory of the Cultural Property of the Maltese Islands.

Architecture

Dragonara Palace is built in neoclassical architecture, and its colonnades are inspired by those of Villa Portelli and Palazzo Capua. The design of the Dragonara Palace later inspired the colonnades of Palazzo Pescatore, which was built in St. Paul's Bay in the late 19th century.

The palace's architect is not known, but it is sometimes attributed to Giuseppe Bonavia.

Palace
The palace originally consisted of a colonnaded villa with a central courtyard. The Scicluna family leased the property in 1964 to the Kursaal Company Limited when the courtyard was roofed becoming the casino's gaming rooms and the Slots Palace was built at the back, which were designed by Dom Mintoff, an architect who eventually became Prime Minister of Malta. At this stage the Sheraton Hotel was built on the ground of the palace's gardens that was eventually replaced by The Westin Dragonara.

Gardens

When the palace was originally built, it was surrounded by extensive gardens. Part of these were destroyed to make way for The Westin Dragonara hotel and the casino's parking lot. The palace's Sunken Garden, which contains a number of fountains and olive trees, is now located within the grounds of The Westin Dragonara.

Art

Main entrance
The main entrance into the palace's gardens consists of an arch with the inscription Deus Nobis Haec Otia Fecit, meaning "God made these leisures for us". It is designated as a Grade 1 property by the Malta Environment and Planning Authority.

Statue of Neptune

A fountain containing a statue of Neptune was located at the entrance of the palace, just after the path leading from the gardens. The statue was built in the 19th century, but it is inspired by an earlier statue of Neptune which is now found in the courtyard of the Grandmaster's Palace in Valletta. The fountain and statue are now located inside the palace for their preservation.

Statue of Marquis Scicluna
Since the statue of Neptune was relocated to the palace, a life-sized statue of Marquis Emmanuele Scicluna has been located in its place. The statue was designed by the Italian sculptor Giulio Moschetti, and it was restored in 2014.

Egyptian caryatids
Two Egyptian-style caryatids are located near the palace's doorway, supporting the building.

Frescoes
Some rooms of the palace contain frescoes painted by Vincenzo Maria Cremona. The fresco in the Yellow Room shows military and floral paraphernalia, as well as a bird holding a garland of roses. The ceiling panels of the Green Room has frescoes showing a personification of industry.

References

Sources

External links

Official website

Palaces in Malta
Casinos in Malta
Neoclassical architecture in Malta
Buildings and structures completed in 1870
St. Julian's, Malta
Defunct hospitals in Malta
National Inventory of the Cultural Property of the Maltese Islands
1870 establishments in Malta